Charles May may refer to:

Charles A. May (1818–1864), American military officer and hero of the Battle of Resaca de la Palma
Charles May (industrialist), a partner in the British machinery company Ransomes, Sims & Jefferies 
Charles May (Canadian politician) (1858–1932), Canadian politician and former mayor of Edmonton, Alberta
Charles May (bishop), South African Anglican bishop
Charles F. May, American architect, designer of St. John's Lutheran College-Baden Hall
Charles S. May (1830–1901), American politician and former lieutenant governor of Michigan
Charles May (police officer) (c. 1818–1879), police officer and Superintendent of the Hong Kong Fire Brigade
Charles E. May, writer and professor of English at California State University, Long Beach
Charles Wesley May, gospel artist who performed on Quincy Jones' version of Ai No Corrida

See also
Charlie May (disambiguation)
Charles Mays (1941–2005), American Olympic athlete and Democratic party politician
Charles Mayer (disambiguation)